Danger Down Under is a Nancy Drew and Hardy Boys Supermystery crossover novel, published in 1995.

Plot summary
Mick Devlin, an Australian admirer of Nancy Drew's, asks her to help his Aboriginal friend Nellie Mabo, who is trying to locate a missing sacred artifact, a tjuringa board, to return it to her clan. She suspects the proprietors of an opal mine. The Hardy boys join Nancy in Australia, where they find the mystery complicated by a clash over land rights in the Outback and a blood-hungry poacher on the verge of creating a new endangered species.

References

External links
Danger Down Under at Fantastic Fiction
Supermystery series books

Supermystery
1995 American novels
1995 children's books
Novels set in Australia